Liu Zhongqing (born November 10, 1985, in Daqing, Heilongjiang) is a Chinese aerial skier.  He won a bronze medal at the 2010 Winter Olympics in the aerials.

References

External links
 
 

1985 births
Living people
Chinese male freestyle skiers
Freestyle skiers at the 2006 Winter Olympics
Freestyle skiers at the 2010 Winter Olympics
Freestyle skiers at the 2014 Winter Olympics
Freestyle skiers at the 2018 Winter Olympics
Olympic bronze medalists for China
Olympic freestyle skiers of China
People from Daqing
Olympic medalists in freestyle skiing
Skiers from Heilongjiang
Medalists at the 2010 Winter Olympics
Asian Games medalists in freestyle skiing
Freestyle skiers at the 2007 Asian Winter Games
Freestyle skiers at the 2011 Asian Winter Games
Asian Games silver medalists for China
Asian Games bronze medalists for China
Medalists at the 2011 Asian Winter Games
Medalists at the 2007 Asian Winter Games
Universiade medalists in freestyle skiing
Universiade silver medalists for China
Competitors at the 2009 Winter Universiade